Schutz is a German surname, related to Schütz (which needs to be spelled Schuetz without umlaut ü). Notable people with the surname include:

Alfred Schutz, Phenomenological philosopher and sociologist
Bernard F. Schutz (born 1946), physicist
Dana Schutz, painter in New York
David Schütz, Israeli writer
Guillermo Schutz (born 1980), Mexican sports announcer
Heinrich Schütz, German composer
Herbert Schutz (1937-2018), German-born Canadian philologist
Ignaz Schütz (1867-1927), Czech–German mathematician and a physicist
Johan Christher Schütz, Swedish singer and composer
Katelin Schutz, physicist and cosmologist
Maurice Schutz, French actor
Peter W. Schutz (born 1930), Porsche manager
 Philipp Balthasar Sinold von Schütz (1657–1742), German writer
Roger Louis Schutz-Marsauche (Frère Roger, 1915–2005)
Susan Polis Schutz, American poet
William Schutz, psychologist in the 1960s

See also 
Schutzjude, an old status for German Jews
Schutzwald, protection forest (Switzerland)
Schütz
Schütze

German-language surnames
Occupational surnames

Philipp Balthasar Sinold von Schütz